The 1964 NAIA Soccer Championship was the sixth annual tournament held by the NAIA to determine the national champion of men's college soccer among its members in the United States.

Trenton State defeated Lincoln (PA) in the final, 3–0, to claim the Lions' first NAIA national title.

The final was played at Montclair State College in Upper Montclair, New Jersey.

Bracket

See also  
 1964 NCAA Soccer Championship

References 

NAIA championships
NAIA
NAIA
1964 in sports in New Jersey